The siege of Bautzen was a siege of city of Bautzen, Kingdom of Poland that took place in 1029 during the German–Polish War between 1028 and 1031. Following the raid of Saxony organised by king of Poland, Mieszko II Lambert, Conrad II, the emperor of the Holy Roman Empire, had attacked Poland and organised the siege of the city. Despite heavy casualties, Polish forces managed to defeat the attackers, and Imperial forces had retreated.

Notes

References 

Bautzen
History of Saxony
Bautzen
Bautzen
Bautzen
Bautzen